Nisargadatta Maharaj (born Maruti Shivrampant Kambli; 17 April 1897 – 8 September 1981) was an Indian guru of nondualism, belonging to the Inchagiri Sampradaya, a lineage of teachers from the Navnath Sampradaya and Lingayat Shaivism.

The publication in 1973 of I Am That, an English translation of his talks in Marathi by Maurice Frydman, brought him worldwide recognition and followers, especially from North America and Europe.

Biography

Early life
Nisargadatta was born on 17 April 1897 to Shivrampant Kambli and Parvati bai, in Bombay. The day was also Hanuman Jayanti, the birthday of Hanuman, hence the boy was named 'Maruti', after him. His parents were followers of the Varkari sampradaya, an egalitarian Vaishnavite bhakti tradition which worships Vithoba. His father, Shivrampant, worked as a domestic servant in Mumbai and later became a petty farmer in Kandalgaon.

Maruti Shivrampant Kambli was brought up in Kandalgaon, a small village in the Sindhudurga district of Maharashtra, with his two brothers, four sisters and deeply religious parents. In 1915, after his father died, he moved to Bombay to support his family back home, following his elder brother. Initially he worked as a junior clerk at an office but quickly he opened a small goods store, mainly selling beedis (leaf-rolled cigarettes) and soon owned a string of eight retail shops. In 1924 he married Sumatibai and they had three daughters and a son.

Sadhana

In 1933, he was introduced to his guru, Siddharameshwar Maharaj, the head of the Inchegiri branch of the Navnath Sampradaya, by his friend Yashwantrao Baagkar. His guru told him, "You are not what you take yourself to be...". Siddharameshwar initiated him into the Inchegiri Sampradaya, giving him meditation-instruction and a mantra, which he immediately began to recite. Siddharameshwar gave Nisargadatta instructions for self-enquiry which he followed verbatim, as he himself recounted later:

Following his guru's instructions to concentrate on the feeling "I Am", he used all his spare time looking at himself in silence, and remained in that state for the coming years, practising meditation and singing devotional bhajans:

After an association that lasted hardly two and a half years, Siddharameshwar Maharaj died on 9 November 1936. In 1937, Maharaj left Mumbai and travelled across India. After eight months he returned to his family in Mumbai in 1938. On the journey home his state of mind changed, realizing that "nothing was wrong anymore." He spent the rest of his life in Mumbai, maintaining one shop to earn an income.

Later years
Between 1942 and 1948 he suffered two personal losses, first the death of his wife, Sumatibai, followed by the death of his daughter. He started to give initiations in 1951, after a personal revelation from his guru, Siddharameshwar Maharaj.

After he retired from his shop in 1966, Nisargadatta Maharaj continued to receive and teach visitors in his home, giving discourses twice a day, until his death on 8 September 1981 at the age of 84, of throat cancer.

Teachings

Style of teaching
Nisargadatta gave talks and answered questions at his humble flat in Khetwadi, Mumbai, where a mezzanine room was created for him to receive disciples and visitors. This room was also used for daily chantings, bhajans (devotional songs), meditation sessions, and discourses.

Cathy Boucher notes that the Inchagiri Sampradaya emphasized mantra meditation from its inception in the early 19th century, but that the emphasis shifted toward a form of Self-enquiry with Sri Siddharameshwar. Nevertheless,

Boucher also notes that Nisargadatta adopted a different mode of instruction, through questions and answers, for his western disciples. Many of Nisargadatta Maharaj's talks were recorded, and formed the basis of I Am That as well as of the several other books attributed to him.

Awareness of true nature

According to Timothy Conway, Nisargadatta's only subject was

Nisargadatta explains:

In Consciousness and the Absolute, Nisargadatta Maharaj further explains:

Self-enquiry
According to Conway, awareness of the Absolute could be regained by

Devotion and mantra repetition
Nisargadatta was critical of a merely intellectual approach to nondual Truth. He had a strong devotional zeal towards his own guru, and suggested the path of devotion, Bhakti yoga, to some of his visitors, as he believed the path of knowledge, Jnana yoga was not the only approach to Truth. Nisargadatta also emphasized love of Guru and God, and the practice of mantra repetition and singing bhajans, devotional songs.

Scriptures
According to Timothy Conway, Nisargadatta often read Marathi scriptures: Nath saint Jnanesvar's Amritanubhava and Jnanesvari (Gita Commentary); Varkari Sants, namely Eknatha's Bhagavat (Eknathi Bhagavata, a rewrite of the Bhagavad Purana), Ramdas' Dasbodha, and Tukaram's poems; but also the Yoga Vasistha, Adi Shankara's treatises, and some major Upanishads.

Nisarga Yoga 
Nisargadatta taught what has been called Nisarga Yoga (Nisarga can be translated as "nature"). In I Am That, Nisarga Yoga is defined as living life with "harmlessness," "friendliness," and "interest," abiding in "spontaneous awareness" while being "conscious of effortless living." The practice of this form of Yoga involves meditating on one's sense of "I am", "being" or "consciousness" with the aim of reaching its ultimate source prior to this sense, which Nisargadatta called the "Self".

The second edition of I Am That includes an epilogue titled Nisarga Yoga by Maurice Frydman which includes this passage:Nisargadatta did not prescribe a specific practice for self-knowledge but advised his disciples, "Don't pretend to be what you are not, don't refuse to be what you are." By means of self-enquiry, he advised, "Why don't you enquire how real are the world and the person?". Nisargadatta frequently spoke about the importance of having the "inner conviction" about one's true nature and without such Self-knowledge one would continue to suffer. Nisargadatta claimed that the names of the Hindu deities Shiva, Rama and Krishna were the names of nature (Nisarga) personified, and that all of life arises from the same non-dual source or Self. Remembrance of this source was the core of Nisargadatta's message:The Seven Principles of Nisarga Yoga (As identified by Nic Higham, 2018) 

 Non-identification and right understanding
 Interest and earnestness
 Spontaneity and effortlessness
 Attentiveness to being
 Right action
 Going within to go beyond
 Awareness of Self

Lineage

Disciples
Among his best known disciples are Maurice Frydman, Sailor Bob Adamson, Stephen Howard Wolinsky (born 31 January 1950), Jean Dunn, Alexander Smit (Sri Parabrahmadatta Maharaj) (1948-1998), Douwe Tiemersma (7 January 1945 – 3 January 2013), Robert Powell, Timothy Conway, Wayne Dyer and Ramesh Balsekar (1917-2009). A less well known disciple is Sri Ramakant Maharaj (born 8 July 1941), who received the naam mantra from Nisargadatta in 1962, spent the next 19 years with the master. and claims to be "the only Indian direct disciple of Shri Nisargadatta Maharaj" who offers initiation into this lineage. Sachin Kshirsagar, who has published a series of books on Nisargadatta in the Marathi language and also re-published Master of Self Realization, says to have received the Naam (Mantra) in a dream from Shree Nisargadatta Maharaj on 17 Oct., 2011.

Successors
David Godman gives the following account of an explanation by Nisargadatta of the succession of Gurus in the Inchagiri Sampradaya:

According to David Godman, Nisargadatta was not allowed by Siddharameshwar to appoint a successor, because he "wasn't realised himself when Siddharameshwar passed away." Nisargadatta started to initiate others in 1951, after receiving an inner revelation from Siddharamesvar. Nisargadatta himself explains:

See also
 Maurice Frydman
 Ramana Maharshi
 Ramesh Balsekar
 Samarth Ramdas

Notes

References

Sources

Printed sources

 
 
 
 
 
 Sri Nisargadatta Maharaj - Maurice Frydman - I am That - Tamil Translation - Year 2016 - title Naan Brammam - place =Chennai, India  publisher =Kannadhasan Pathippagam 

Web sources

Further reading
 Stephen Howard Wolinsky, I Am That I Am: A Tribute to Sri Nisargadatta. 2000. .
 Peter Brent, Godmen of India. NY: Quadrangle Books, 1972, pp. 136–40.
 S. Gogate & P.T. Phadol, Meet the Sage: Shri Nisargadatta, Sri Sadguru Nisargadatta Maharaj Amrit Mahotsav Samiti, 1972.
 Neal Rosner (Swami Paramatmananda), On the Road to Freedom: A Pilgrimage in India, Vol. 1, San Ramon, CA: Mata Amritanandamayi Center, 1987, pp. 212–8. Ramesh Sadashiv Balsekar, Explorations into the Eternal: Forays from the Teaching of Nisargadatta Maharaj . 1989. .
 Ramesh Sadashiv Balsekar, Pointers from Nisargadatta Maharaj. 1990 . .
 Bertram Salzman, Awaken to the Eternal: Nisargadatta Maharaj: a Journey of Self Discovery. 2006. .
 Saumitra Krishnarao Mullarpattan (died September 2012), The Last Days of Nisargadatta Maharaj. India: Yogi Impressions Books, 2007. .
 Dasbodh – Spiritual Instruction for the Servant'' – Saint Shri Samartha Ramdas, Sadguru Publishing, 2010

DVDs
 Awaken to the Eternal, Nisargadatta Maharaj: A Journey of Self-Discovery. 1995.
 Tatvamasi – You Are That (2009), 87 min. Online

External links

Nisargadatta websites
 www.maharajnisargadatta.com – a Resource website
 www.nisargadatta.co.uk – The essential message/teachings of Sri Nisargadatta Maharaj
Generic Web resources on Nisargadatta

 Nisargadatta compilation of quotes from various books
 Nisargadatta core teachings summarised from the book "The Essential Nisargadatta"
Lineage
 Disciples of Nisargadatta Maharaj
  
Background and biography
 
 Remembering Nisargadatta Maharaj, reflections of David Godman
 Timothy Conway, Sri Nisargadatta Maharaj (1897-1981), Life & Teachings of Bombay's Fiery Sage of Liberating Wisdom
Films
DVDs about Sri Nisargadatta Maharaj
Videos about Sri Nisargadatta Maharaj
Publications by Nisargadatta Maharaj
 I Am That pdf

1897 births
1981 deaths
Advaitin philosophers
Indian Hindu spiritual teachers
20th-century Indian philosophers
Scholars from Mumbai
Inchegeri Sampradaya
Marathi Hindu saints